The swimming portion of the 2011 FINA World Championships was held July 24–31 at the Shanghai Oriental Sports Center in Shanghai, China. Swimming is one of five aquatic disciplines at the championships.

Qualifying criteria
In January 2010, the FINA Bureau approved the swimming qualification system for the 2011 World Aquatics Championships. This represented the first time that a qualification system (including time standards) was used for the swimming portion of the world championships. Times had to be swum at a FINA approved competition/meet between March 1, 2010 and June 30, 2011. The qualification meets included continental championships in 2010 and 2011 (e.g. European Championships, Asian Games, Pan American Games); and international competitions approved by FINA in advance. All meets for the qualification were swam in 50 meters course.

The qualifying system for individual events was similar to what is employed for the Olympics. Historically, there has been a limit of 2 swimmers per country per individual event, and one relay team per country per relay event. This limitation remains; however, if a country wished to have more than one male and one female swimmer in up to 2 events each, then an athlete(s) had to meet one of two standards:
a B standard which qualifies up to one swimmer per event, or
an A standard which qualifies up to two swimmers per event, where both swimmers must meet this faster standard.

Events

The swimming competition featured races in a long course (50 m) pool in 40 events (20 for males, 20 for females; 17 individual events and 3 relays for each gender).

The evening session schedule for the 2011 World Aquatics Championships is shown below.

Note: prelims/semifinals/finals will be swum in events 200 m and shorter; prelims/finals in events 400 m or longer. For prelims/semifinals/finals events, prelims and semis will be held on the same day, with finals being the evening of the following day. For the 400 m events and the 800 m relays, prelims and finals are the same day. For the individual 800 m and 1500 m races, prelims are in the morning of one day, with finals in the evening of the next day. Preliminary sessions began at 9:00 a.m.; finals at 6:00 p.m.

Medal table

Results

Men's events

Women's events

World records
The following world records were established during the competition:

References

External links
Official website

 
World Championships
2011 World Aquatics Championships
Swimming at the World Aquatics Championships
Swimming in Shanghai